Frisilia anningensis is a moth in the family Lecithoceridae. It is found in China (Yunnan).

The wingspan is about 19 mm.

References

Moths described in 1997
Frisilia